The Ottoman Electoral Law was promulgated in December 1876 alongside the Ottoman constitution. The law underwent minimal amendments during the course of the Second Constitutional Era and was retained by the Republic of Turkey with slight revisions until 1946.

The law was detailed in nature, encompassing a wide range of electoral matters. The law pertained to-among others-electoral districts, parliamentary contingencies, the preparation of registers, the method of selection and the duties of electoral inspection committees, suffrage requirements and the general conduct of elections. The law also included penal clauses.

Background 
In 1860 the Provincial Law was passed. Preceding the Ottoman Electoral Law, the Provincial Law included elections for the neighborhood headmen. It is such arguable that elections in the Ottoman Empire began in 1860 and not 1876. Registration was the task of village and neighborhood headmen and religious leaders, a practice which was retained by the Ottoman Electoral Law. In this respect, elections in the fundamental, local level, did not change with the introduction of the Electoral Law.

Electoral structure 
All males above the age 25 who were registered at the tax office were entitled to vote. There were exemptions, such as proteges of a foreign government, persons filed for bankruptcy and those disposed of their property. The prisoners were also eligible unless deprived of their civil rights.

The election process was indirect and featured two stages. One deputy in the Chamber of Deputies for every 50,000 male residents. The provincial subdivision was the sanjak. Inspection units were the kaza. Candidacy for deputy was province-wide. Eligible voters elected secondary candidates (that is two stage voting): one for every 500 primary candidates. The two-stage system reinforced patronage relationships and precluded the election of candidates truly representative of the common people.

Balloting 
The election was a staggered and drawn-out process that was not coordinated throughout the empire or even the province. Balloting was based on the multiple-member plurality system. The voters wrote in as many names as there were candidates. A candidate could run either in his province of residence or province of origin. There were rules for the secrecy of balloting and security of tallying and tabulating.

Analysis 
In Raoul de la Grasserie's detailed comparative study of electoral systems, the Ottoman electoral system was portrayed favorably to its contemporary Western counterparts due to the extent of suffrage it provided for. In contrast to the contemporary electoral systems of Germany, Russia, Japan, and England, there was no legally stipulated weighted voting, distributed among different social groups.

Bibliography

Notes

References

1876 establishments in the Ottoman Empire
1876 in law
Elections in the Ottoman Empire
Electoral